Digital magnetofluidics is a method for moving, combining, splitting, and controlling  drops of water or biological fluids using magnetic fields.  This is accomplished by adding superparamagnetic particles to a drop placed on a superhydrophobic surface.  Normally this type of surface would exhibit a lotus effect and the drop of water would roll or slide off.  But by using magnetic fields, the drop is stabilized and its movements and structure can be controlled.

References
 A. Egatz-Gomez, S. Melle, A.A. García, S. Lindsay, M.A. Rubio, P. Domínguez, T. Picraux, J. Taraci, T. Clement, and M. Hayes, “Superhydrophobic Nanowire Surfaces for Drop Movement Using Magnetic Fields,” in Proc. NSTI Nanotechnology Conference and Trade Show, 2006, pp. 501–504. 

Fluid mechanics